Tonči Gulin (1938 — 26 Augustus 1999) was a Croatian football player.

Club career
Born in Split, as a player he spent his early years with RNK Split before moving to HNK Rijeka. He was Split's top scorer during the 1960-61 Yugoslav First League season, and Rijeka's top scorer during the 1964-65 Yugoslav First League season. Later in his career, he had a season each with Boston Beacons in the North American Soccer League and with 1. FC Saarbrücken in Germany.

References

1938 births
1999 deaths
Footballers from Split, Croatia
Association football forwards
Yugoslav footballers
RNK Split players
HNK Rijeka players
Boston Beacons players
1. FC Saarbrücken players
Yugoslav First League players
North American Soccer League (1968–1984) players
Yugoslav expatriate footballers
Expatriate soccer players in the United States
Yugoslav expatriate sportspeople in the United States
Expatriate footballers in West Germany
Yugoslav expatriate sportspeople in West Germany
Burials at Lovrinac Cemetery